The House of Oršić (Orssich) is the name of an old Croatian noble family, descending from the Croatian noble clan of Lapčan and Karinjan, remarkable in the Kingdom of Croatia in personal union with Hungary and within the Habsburg Monarchy respectively, whose notable members were politicians, senior military officers, župans or other state officials, as well as cultural workers and patrons.

Family history 

The first mention of the Oršić family name appeared in a document from Knin in 1420. The members of the family were mentioned to have originated from the area of Unac River, a tributary of Una, in the medieval Croatian county of Pset. In another document from 1449, they are quoted as "Oršićs from Udrinić" (present-day Drinić, a village in the Bosanski Petrovac Municipality, western Bosnia and Herzegovina).

In the middle of the 15th century (between 1464 and 1472), the Oršićs moved to the northwest, due to the fall of the Kingdom of Bosnia and increasing danger of Ottoman Turks' territorial advancement. They settled in Gorička County, near present-day Karlovac, and acquired some smaller estates (Orehovac, Dol, Lipovac). In 1487, king Matija Korvin granted them Slavetić estate, northwest of Jastrebarsko, and since then they carried the name Orssichs of Slavetich. They had a new castle built there, which still exists today. Later they gained other estates like Gornja Stubica, Gornja Bistra and Jurketinec (near Varaždin).

In the 17th century the whole family property was in hands of a single man, Matija (Matthew) (c. 1600–1680), who was a captain of the Croatian Military Frontier. With his wealth he enabled his descendants to advance further in the army, and to gain higher social status, power and reputation.

Matija's son Ivan Franjo Oršić (John Francis; 1630–1686) achieved the rank of vice-general of the Karlovac generalate. He performed the duty of grand župan of the Modruš County as well, and in 1675 he was given the title of hereditary baron. Much later, in 1744, his great-grandson Krsto /Christopher/ (1718–1782), a vice field marshal of the Habsburg monarchy imperial army, grand župan of the Zagreb County and the assessor of the Tabula Banalis, Ban's (viceroy's) Supreme Court, was given the hereditary title of count, for his military merits.

Adam Oršić (1748–1820), the eldest son of Krsto, performed the duty of imperial and royal chamberlain and was a chronicler of the Oršić family. By the end of his life he wrote a large genealogy and history book of his own family. His son Juraj (George) (1780–1847) was a politician, one of the leading supporters of Illyrian movement and Croatian national revival, who advocated the introduction of Croatian (instead of Latin) as official into Croatian institutions.

From Ivan Nepomuk Oršić (1752–1792), Adam's younger brother, originate all further members of the family, whose descendants live today in many countries all over the world. For an extensive genealogy of the family see Records of the Tötösy de Zepetnek Family / A Zepetneki Tötösy család adattára

Gallery

See also
 History of Croatia
 Kingdom of Croatia (Habsburg)
 Military Frontier

References

External links

 A short Oršić noble family history
 Some members of the family
 Oršić family in Arhinet – Croatian Archive Information System
 Oršić family in the Croatian State Archives
 genealogy of the Orssich de Slavetich family in 

Orsic
Families of the Habsburg monarchy